Player 7 is a South Korean television program which airs on tvN and XtvN on Sundays at 18:15 (KST) from July 14, 2019 to December 8, 2019 for Season 1.

On January 7, 2020 it was confirmed that the show will return with Season 2, airing on every Saturday at 18:10 (KST) starting February 1. Hwang Chi-yeul will join the original cast lineup for the season. The season ended on March 21.

Synopsis 
The cast members have to hold their laughs and go through different scenarios. Every time a player laughs, ₩10,000 will be deducted instantly from his own appearance fee, and also get dowsed with water that comes out from a backpack each worn by each player. At the end of each theme, the cast member with the least amount of laughs will have his appearance fee paid in full.

 In some scenarios, the guests invited by the production crew will follow the "do not laugh at any time" rule, otherwise they have to also get wet in the same way as the cast members. 
 In some themes, it is possible for the cast members to have more or less than the fixed of their appearance fees deducted, or even have the deduction reset to zero, through additional small rules/games in the scenarios.

The changes made for Season 2 are as follow:
 The cast members will carry the water backpacks in only some scenarios, instead of all scenarios.
 More types of role play will be done, rather than focusing on holding their laughs.
 Season 1 is an individual battle to protect their appearance fees, while for Season 2 it will be a team battle.
 For the season, besides the scenarios, a special corner named Bonus Play is shown at the end of each episode, where each member individually does a short skit or the production team provides bonus footage edits.

Cast

Intern Player (for only Season 1)

Episodes (2019, Season 1)

Episodes (2020, Season 2)

Discography 
This album was released as a compilation of all the members for the episode "Show Me The Play 2".

Ratings 
 This show airs on a cable channel/pay TV which normally has a relatively smaller audience compared to free-to-air TV/public broadcasters (KBS, SBS, MBC and EBS)
 Ratings listed below are the individual corner ratings of Player 7. (Note: Individual corner ratings do not include commercial time, which regular ratings include.)

2019 (Season 1)

2020 (Season 2)

Notes

References

External links 
 
 

South Korean comedy television series
South Korean reality television series
South Korean variety television shows
2019 South Korean television series debuts
Korean-language television shows